Illinois Route 4 is a major north–south highway that runs south from the Interstate 55 business loop around the state capital of Springfield, south to Illinois Route 13 just north of Murphysboro.

Route description
It zigzags through small southern towns such as Steeleville, Sparta, and Marissa, before straightening out near Mascoutah. IL Route 4 is an important road in St. Clair and Madison counties as it connects many suburbs and exurbs on the eastern edge of St. Louis, including Mascoutah, Lebanon, Troy, Highland, Edwardsville, Hamel, Staunton, Benld, and Gillespie. From Carlinville northwards the route is important since it connects many medium-sized rural towns and bedroom communities in Macoupin and Sangamon counties, such as Girard, Virden, Auburn, and Chatham, with Springfield. The road passes directly through Chatham, a fast-growing city that has transformed into a southern suburb and bedroom community for Springfield, which directly abuts the north edge of Chatham.

Within the City of Springfield, IL Route 4 is known as Veterans Parkway. It completes the western loop around the city, and is a divided four-lane highway that serves the major commercial area centered around the intersection of Veterans Parkway and Wabash Avenue, which includes White Oaks Mall.

History
Illinois State Bond Issue Route 4 was the first numbered through route between Chicago and St. Louis, as shown on the 1924 Illinois Road Map. As such it was the forerunner of more famous routes US 66 and Interstate 55.

In 1926, a new alignment for Route 4 was opened between Joliet and Lyons, on the north side of the Des Plaines River. The old alignment on the east and south sides of the curving river through Lemont was renamed Illinois Route 4A and then renamed again in 1967 as Illinois Route 171. Illinois Route 4A generally followed Archer Avenue from the Chicago city limits to Lemont.

When U.S. Route 66 was first designated in 1926, it coincided with IL 4 for its entire length; however, the earliest state map in 1927 erroneously showed Route 66 coinciding with IL 4A through the near Chicago suburbs instead of IL 4. Also, the section of IL 4 from just south of Staunton to Springfield was originally shown only as "Temporary U.S. Route 66," whereas the permanent routing of Route 66 was shown as proposed or under construction on a more eastern route, away from IL 4 through Litchfield. The new path of U.S. Route 66 was completed as SBI 16 and SBI 126 in 1930, and the Route 66 designation was then removed from IL 4 between Staunton and Springfield. Illinois Route 4 and U.S. Route 66 remained as coincident, co-signed routes between the Mississippi River and Staunton and between Springfield and Chicago until 1935, when the IL 4 designation was dropped from portions where it overlapped with Route 66, leaving only the portion from Staunton to Springfield as IL 4. This left IL 4A as an orphan alternate route of IL 4 from Lyons to Joliet, until it was renumbered as IL 171 in 1967.

The section of modern IL 4 from Staunton to its southern end near Murphysboro was originally IL 43. In 1964, IL 4 was extended on this highway, and the number IL 43 was eventually reused in the Chicago metro area to mark parts of Waukegan Road and Harlem Avenue.

Historical designation
A bypassed portion of old route 4 north of Auburn is listed in the National Register of Historic Places as "Illinois Route 4-North of Auburn". It was added in 1998 as structure #98000979 and consists of two c.1920 bridges over Little Panther Creek and portions of Curran and Snell roads.

Major intersections

References

External links

 Illinois Highway Ends: Illinois Route 4
 Illinois Digital Archives: State Highway Maps

004
004
Interstate 55
Transportation in Jackson County, Illinois
Transportation in Perry County, Illinois
Transportation in Randolph County, Illinois
Transportation in Washington County, Illinois
Transportation in St. Clair County, Illinois
Transportation in Madison County, Illinois
Transportation in Macoupin County, Illinois
Transportation in Sangamon County, Illinois